Probable fibrosin-1 long transcript protein is a protein that in humans is encoded by the FBRS gene.

Fibrosin is a lymphokine secreted by activated lymphocytes that induces fibroblast proliferation (Prakash and Robbins, 1998).

References

Further reading